Louise Hunt (born 24 May 1991) is a British wheelchair tennis player who competes in international level events. She was a former world number 2 in the junior wheelchair tennis singles rankings, she was a bronze medalist at the 2011 BNP Paribas World Team Cup and silver medalist at the 2012 BNP Paribas World Team Cup.

Personal history 
Louise started playing wheelchair tennis aged five and became a very successful junior player, winning the girls’ doubles title on three occasions at the Junior Wheelchair Tennis Masters in Tarbes, France. 
She studied Sports Performance graduating from University of Bath.

Hunt is engaged to Chris Skelley; they are due to be married on 3 September 2022 at Holbrook Manor, near Wincanton in Somerset

Tennis career
She reached a career best junior ranking of No. 2 in January 2009. Louise won her first senior women's singles title in Turkey in 2009 and added a second title in Turkey later that year.
Louise made her Paralympic debut at London 2012, competing in the women's singles competition, and competed in her first away Games at Rio 2016.
In 2019 the LTA, the governing body of tennis in Britain, hosted international wheelchair tennis in Oxfordshire for the very first time, British number three Hunt beat second seed and three-time national champion Lauren Jones 6–4, 6–4 in the women's singles final after dropping just one game in the earlier rounds.

Filmography

Television

References

External links 
 
 
 
 
 

1991 births
Living people
British female tennis players
British wheelchair tennis players
Paralympic wheelchair tennis players of Great Britain
Wheelchair tennis players at the 2012 Summer Paralympics
Wheelchair tennis players at the 2016 Summer Paralympics
People from the Borough of Swindon
21st-century British women